The Magician's Guild was an organization founded by Theodore Hardeen.

Presidents
Theodore Hardeen (1876–1945) and founder, 1944 to 1945
Richard Valentine Pitchford (1895-1973) 1945 to ?
George Jason

References

Guild of America, Magicians
Guilds in the United States